Suspect is an interactive fiction video game designed by Dave Lebling and published by Infocom in 1984. It is the third and last murder mystery Infocom released. It was written in highly portable ZIL and released for Amiga, Amstrad CPC, Amstrad PCW, Apple II, Atari 8-bit family, Atari ST, Commodore 64, Kaypro II, Macintosh, and MS-DOS. It is Infocom's fifteenth game.

Plot

The player's character is a reporter for the fictitious newspaper The Washington Representative. Veronica Ashcroft-Wellman, a longtime friend and wealthy socialite, has sent an invitation to the annual Ashcroft Halloween Ball, where Maryland's high society bluebloods rub elbows, network, and congratulate each other on their fortunes. The paper's editor suggests covering the party as a story, smelling an easy article that could either praise or mock the wealthy. Since it is a costume party, the player's character suits up in a rented cowboy outfit and moseys over to the bash. Many attendees wear masks, making it difficult to initially identify them.

Not long into the party, however, Veronica is found dead—strangled with a very familiar-looking lariat, with a bullet from the costume's gunbelt lying near the body for good measure. But the player stashed the rope in the closet earlier, and the bullet is missing from the back of the belt; anyone could have taken them! Nevertheless, the player is the prime suspect in Veronica's murder. A lot of snooping has to be done to identify the real killer.

Release
Suspect included the following physical items in the package:
The satirical book Murder and Modern Manners: A Practical Guide to Murder Manners
A business card from William Cochrane for King's Point Realty (written on the back: "Veronica— Please call me ASAP. Don't do something you'll regret. Bill")
A receipt from "Costumes Unlimited" for the rental of one cowboy costume with lariat and gunbelt
An invitation to the Halloween Ball thrown at Ashcroft Manor (written inside: "Dearest... It has been too long since we last talked. Please do try to come to the party. There are so many things I have to tell you. Until then, Veronica")
A note from the editor of The Washington Representative asking the player's character to cover the ball for the newspaper
A page from The Maryland Countryside magazine, featuring an article about developers encroaching on the "Hunt Club" countryside and a society column piece about the upcoming Halloween Ball

Reception
Based on sales and market-share data, Video magazine listed the game seventh on its list of best selling video games in March 1985. ANALOG Computing praised Suspects technical sophistication, packaging, and premise, but criticized the game's intrusive "dry humor" and cynical tone. The magazine concluded, "It is certainly complex, detailed and imaginative. I just wish it took itself a little more seriously, both as a game and an example of truly interactive fiction".

References

External links
Infocom Gallery entry
Infocom-if.org entry
Infocom Bugs List entry

1980s interactive fiction
1984 video games
Adventure games
Amiga games
Amstrad CPC games
Amstrad PCW games
Apple II games
Atari 8-bit family games
Atari ST games
Commodore 64 games
DOS games
Halloween video games
Infocom games
Classic Mac OS games
Video games developed in the United States
Single-player video games